The M297 is a V12 engine produced by Mercedes-Benz, from 1997 to 2016.

Design 
The M297 is based on the M120 engine but has been tuned by AMG for use in high-performance sports cars.

Engines

M297 
386 kW version
 1997–2001 R129 SL70 AMG SL73 AMG
 1992–1999 C140/W140 CL70/S70 AMG CL73/S73 AMG

408 kW version
 2001–2004 Pagani Zonda S 7.3
 2003–2006 Pagani Zonda S Roadster

442 kW version
 2004 Pagani Zonda S Monza
 2005–2008 Pagani Zonda F

464 kW version
 1997-1999 CLK GTR Straßenversion (6.9 L)

478 kW version
 2006–2011 Pagani Zonda F Clubsport
 2006–2009 Pagani Zonda F Roadster
 2009 Pagani Zonda PS

492 kW version
 2010 Pagani Zonda Tricolore

498 kW version
 2009–2010 Pagani Zonda Cinque
 2010 Pagani Zonda Cinque Roadster
 2010 Pagani Zonda HH

559 kW version
 2012 Pagani Zonda 760LH
 2012 Pagani Zonda 760RS
 2012 Pagani Zonda 764 Passione
 2014 Pagani Zonda LM
 2014 Pagani Zonda X
 2015 Pagani Zonda 760 Zozo
 2015 Pagani Zonda 760 AG Roadster
 2015 Pagani Zonda Kiryu
 2016 Pagani Zonda OLIVER Evolution

588.5 kW version
 2017 Pagani Zonda HP Barchetta

References 

Mercedes-Benz engines
V12 engines
Gasoline engines by model